Frogs is a 1972 American horror film directed by George McCowan. The film falls into the "eco-horror" category, telling the story of an upper-class U.S. Southern family who are victimized by several different animal species, including snakes, birds, lizards, and butterflies. The movie suggests nature may be justified in exacting revenge on this family because of its patriarch's abuse of the local ecology. The film was theatrically released on March 10, 1972.

Plot 
Wildlife photographer Pickett Smith is taking photographs of the local flora and fauna as he canoes through a swamp surrounding the island mansion estate of the wealthy and influential Crockett family. Through the swamp are numerous indicators of pollution, which Pickett believes are connected to pesticide use on the island plantation. After Clint Crockett accidentally tips over his canoe, he and his sister, Karen escort Smith to a mansion where he meets the entire family. The family's grouchy, wheelchair-using patriarch Jason intends spending the next day enjoying both the Fourth of July and his birthday celebrations uninterrupted. Pickett tries to call out with his phone, but it is now dead. Then, Jason sends a man named Grover to get rid of man-eating frogs. Pickett later discovers Grover's corpse covered in snake bites in a nearby swamp not far from Jason's house. Jason orders him not to mention it to anyone else.

Early next morning, Michael Martindale sets out to check on a downed power line. He accidentally shoots himself in the calf and is rendered immobile by strange white moss hanging down from the trees. Tarantulas descend from branches and bites him.

Back at Jason's house, Jason's daughter Iris Martindale sends her son, Ken, into a greenhouse to collect white daisies for a centerpiece. As he gathers the flowers, dozens of tokay geckos and tegus enter behind him. The lizards swarm over the shelves, knocking over numerous jars of poisonous chemicals, and the resulting toxic gas asphyxiates him. Seeing the danger posed by zoo animals, Pickett suggests that everyone leave the island, but Jason is adamant that nothing will ruin his birthday.

While chasing a butterfly, Iris is frightened by snakes and baby alligators, and in a panic, falls into a puddle, where leeches latch on her. Tired and badly injured, she falls down near a sleeping rattlesnake, which bites and kills her. Her husband, Stuart, comes looking for her, falls into a mud and is eaten by two alligators.

On Pickett's advice, Charles and Maybelle (Jason's butler and cook, respectively) decide to leave, along with Kenneth's fiancée, Bella Garrington. Clint takes them across the lake in his speedboat. Clint looks for a nearby bush while the others investigate. A flock of golden eagles appear, and they disappear behind a tree; their fate is left a mystery (though a strewn-open suitcase is seen later). Clint discovers his boat is adrift, thinking that the tether has been gnawed by something and swims to reach it, but a cottonmouth bites him in the water, poisoning him. His wife, Jenny, tries to rescue him, but gets stuck in the river bank and is attacked by an alligator snapping turtle.

Karen and Pickett are forced to leave with Clint and Jenny's children; Jason refuses to join them. They cross the lake in Pickett's canoe, encountering an alligator and water snakes, which Pickett dispatches with a boat paddle and a shotgun. They make it to shore and reach the road, where they hitch a ride with a woman and her son. She tells them that she is heading to Jefferson City and has not seen a single person or car for the past hour, while the boy shows them a huge frog that he took from summer camp.

That night, now alone in his mansion (save for his dog, Colonel), Jason witnesses hundreds of frogs breaking into the house and staring at him. The phone rings, but when he answers it, the line is still dead. Looking around the room at his stuffed animal trophies adds to his tension, and he collapses and dies, apparently from a heart attack. Jason's body becomes completely covered with frogs. All of the lights in the mansion flicker out.

An animated frog appears in the ending credits with a human hand in its mouth. The frog swallows the hand before hopping away.

Cast

Production notes 
The film was shot in Walton County, Florida, on the Emerald Coast in and around Wesley House, an old Southern mansion located in Eden Gardens State Park in the town of Point Washington, situated on Tucker Bayou off Choctawhatchee Bay.

In pre-release prints, Iris (Holly Irving) died by being pulled into quicksand by a giant butterfly, rather than by snakebite. The deleted scene can still be glimpsed in the trailer.

Reception 
Frogs received a score of 29% on Rotten Tomatoes. On Metacritic, the film has a weighted average score of 51 out of 100 based on reviews from 4 critics, indicating "mixed or average reviews".

A reviewer from HorrorNews.net found it odd for a horror film to be titled Frogs when all the killings in the film are done by animals other than frogs and discussed the acting: "Sam Elliott is good as always. He manages to feel like the outsider while also feeling like part of the group. It makes his role work in ways that it might not work in someone else's control. Ray Milland is also fairly good as the patriarch of the Crockett family. He personifies that bullheaded 'you listen to me because I'm always right' attitude in such a believable manner that you think he is that guy. The rest of the cast isn't as great as these two, but their lack of good performance only helps to make their deaths more fun to watch. They overact or underact in the perfect ways to make the movie priceless."

Frogs was shown on the MeTV show Svengoolie on January 8, 2022, and September 3, 2022.

References

External links 
 
 
 
 

1972 films
1972 horror films
1970s American films
1970s English-language films
American International Pictures films
American natural horror films
Films about frogs
Films about lizards
Films based on urban legends
Films directed by George McCowan
Films scored by Les Baxter
Films set in country houses
Films set in Florida
Films set on islands
Films shot in Florida
Holiday horror films
Independence Day (United States) films